A Body Shape Index (ABSI) or simply body shape index (BSI) is a metric for assessing the health implications of a given human body height, mass and waist circumference (WC). The inclusion of WC is believed to make the BSI a better indicator of risk of mortality from excess weight than the standard body mass index. ABSI correlates only slightly with height, weight and BMI, indicating that it is independent of other anthropometric variables in predicting mortality.

A criticism of BMI is that it does not distinguish between muscle and fat mass and so may be elevated in people with increased BMI due to muscle development rather than fat accumulation from overeating. A higher muscle mass may actually reduce the risk of premature death. A high ABSI appears to correspond to a higher proportion of central obesity, or abdominal fat.

In a sample of Americans in the National Health and Nutrition Examination Survey, death rates in some subjects were high for both high and low BMI and WC, a familiar conundrum associated with BMI. In contrast, death rates increased  proportionally with increased values of ABSI. The linear relationship was unaffected by adjustments for other risk factors including smoking, diabetes, elevated blood pressure and serum cholesterol.

The equation for ABSI is based on statistical analysis and is derived from an allometric regression. With waist and height in meters and weight in kg), .
 
Studies have associated ABSI with total mortality and cardiovascular risk, indicating that it is useful in assessing cardio-metabolic risks.

If the ABSI is above 0.083, an increased risk is assumed; a value of 0.091 is said to represent a doubling of the relative risk. 
The ABSI is classified into risk classes by means of the ABSI-z value (z-Value) derived from the ABSI. The ABSI-z is calculated from the deviation of the ABSI from the ABSI mean in relation to the standard deviation. The ABSI means and standard deviations are age- and sex-dependent empirically determined and tabulated.
The calculation is made according to the following formula

with the indices mean: average and std: standard deviation.

The ABSI-z allows classification into the following risk groups for health risk.

To understand the ABSI, it is important to know the relationship between waist circumference and weight. A reduction in weight alone does not necessarily lead to a better risk class. The ABSI uses the waist circumference to take into account the distribution of fat, especially the proportion of abdominal fat. In other words, a reduction in weight and a constant waist circumference worsens the risk classification, while an increase in weight with the same waist circumference leads to an improvement. Thus, more muscle with a small waist circumference leads to a better risk classification. This is a significant difference to BMI. The following diagram shows the progression of risk groups as a function of weight and waist circumference using the example of a 35-year-old man.

References

External links
 Calculate your body shape index (BSI or ABSI).
 Online ABSI Calculator
 ABSI Table male
 ABSI Table female

Body shape
Classification of obesity
Human body weight
Human height
Ratios